Mathias McGirk (1790–1842) of Montgomery County, Missouri, was a justice of the Missouri Supreme Court from 1821 to 1841.

Born in Tennessee, McGirk studied law there before moving to St. Louis around 1814. he served in the Territorial Missouri General Assembly, where in 1816 he was the author of the bill to introduce the common law to Missouri. The bill "passed as he framed it, and many other important statutes were introduced and passed of which he was the author".

He was thereafter appointed as one of the first three judges of the state supreme court in 1821. His colleagues were John D. Cook and John Rice Jones, and their commissions issued in 1820.

McGirk relocated to Montgomery County around 1827 or 1828. He "practiced in all the courts of that circuit, and his name appears among those who attended court in old Franklin". Shortly after moving to Montgomery County he married Elizabeth Talbott, from an old and influential family there.

He authored Rachel v. Walker, 4 Mo. 350 (1836), which freed an enslaved woman who had been taken to free territory by an Army officer. Walker was an important predecessor to the Dred Scott case.  Mathias' brother, Isaac McGirk, represented Marguerite Scypion in her claim for freedom in the Missouri courts in 1805. An 1892 biography provided this sketch:

McGirk was fond of agriculture, and built what was described as "a beautiful residence" on or near Lautre Island, one of the islands of the Missouri River, near the present town of Hermann, Missouri.

Another biography described McGirk as follows:

McGirk never had any children. His widow survived him by many years.

References

1790 births
1842 deaths
Judges of the Supreme Court of Missouri
People from Montgomery County, Missouri
People from Tennessee
Members of the Missouri Territorial Legislature
Missouri Whigs
19th-century American judges